Yakiv Mikhailovych Yatsynevych (Ukrainian: Яків Михайлович Яциневич, 1869–1945) was a prominent Ukrainian composer, conductor, and folklorist, known for his eclectic works.

He studied with Mykola Lysenko in Kiev. From 1903 to 1906, he conducted the men's choir at Kiev University and a mixed choir at Odessa (1925–30). His works include the Symphony "Year 1905," the Oratoria "Skorbna Maty" (with words by Pavlo Tychyna), church music ("Sluzhba Bozha," Cantatas on the Themes of St. George, Basil, Peter, and Paul), choral works, and about 200 songs.

Ukrainian classical composers
1869 births
1945 deaths